The Count of the Tent (komēs tēs kortēs) was a Byzantine military-administrative office attested from the 8th to the early 12th centuries.

History and functions
The title derives from korte, "tent". The emperor often had a Count of the Tent in his own, personal service, the most famous of whom was Michael the Amorian under Nikephoros I (r. 802–811). According to the 10th-century Emperor Constantine VII Porphyrogennetos, during Imperial campaigns through the provinces (themes), the Imperial Count of the Tent and his subordinates, the kortinarioi, were responsible for pitching the Imperial tent and assisting the Drungary of the Watch in keeping watch over the camp at night.

The Count is also attested as an official attached to the staff of a strategos, the military governor of a theme, in seals and documents from the 8th to the early 12th centuries; on seals, the province where he served is often denoted. The office's functions are not clear, but based on his role in narrative sources the Count seems to have been mostly involved with police and judicial matters; Nicolas Oikonomides views him as "a sort of chief of staff". They seem to have borne mid-level court ranks such as spatharios and kandidatos.

References

Sources

 

Byzantine military offices